Jamalpur Sadar is an upazila of Jamalpur District in the Division of Mymensingh, Bangladesh.

Geography
It has 102,578 households and a total area of 489.56 km2. It is bounded by Sherpur sadar and Nakla upazilas on the north, Madhupur, Dhanbari and Muktagachha upazilas on the south, Muktagachha and Mymensingh sadar upazilas on the east, Melandaha, Madarganj and Sarishabari upazilas on the west.

Demographics
Par the 2001 Bangladesh census, Jamalpur sadar upazila had a population of 568726; males constituted 290159, females 278567; Muslim 556986, Hindu 10807, Buddhist 299, Christian 36 and others 598. Indigenous communities such as Garo and Koch belong to this upazila.

According to the 1991 Bangladesh census, Jamalpur Sadar had a population of 501,924, of whom 263,338 were aged 18 or over. Males constituted 51.47% of the population, and females 48.53%. Jamalpur Sadar had an average literacy rate of 27.6% (7+ years), against the national average of 32.4% .

Administration
Jamalpur Sadar Upazila is divided into Jamalpur Municipality and 15 union parishads: Banshchara, Digpaith, Ghoradhap, Itail, Kendua, Lakshmir Char, Meshta, Narundi, Ranagachha, Rashidpur, Sahabajpur, Sharifpur, Sreepur, Titpalla, and Tulsir Char. The union parishads are subdivided into 250 mauzas and 365 villages.

Upazila Nirbahi Officer (UNO): Mohammad Abdul Salam

See also
Upazilas of Bangladesh
Districts of Bangladesh
Divisions of Bangladesh
Narayanganj-Bahadurabad Ghat Line

References

Upazilas of Jamalpur District